Dr. Mohammed Zniber (1923–1993) was a Moroccan writer and historian. He also played an important role in the period of struggle for Morocco's struggle for independence from the French. He was a son of Moufti Boubker Zniber, the initiator of the petition against the Berber Dahir of the colonial French rule. In February 1944, he was arrested by the French together with his brother and father and spent three months in prison. After the war he was a history teacher and head of the history department of the University of Rabat. He is especially well known for his writings on the resistance fighters Frantz Fanon and Muhammad Ibn 'Abd al-Karim al-Khattabi and the history of his native town Salé.

References

Mohamed Zniber, "L'itineraire psycho-intellectuel d'ibn Toumert, ambos en Mahdisme." Crise et changement dans l'Histoire du Maroc (Table ronde), Rabat, 1994, 15-29
Mohammed Zniber, "La guerre du Rif: Mohammed ben Abd el Krim" in Le Mémorial du Maroc, 1912-1934 volume 5
Mohammed Zniber, 1983. : "Zineb Nefzaouia", Le Mémorial du Maroc, Volume 2
Mohammed Zniber, "Sens des médias chez les Almohades"; In Le Mémorial du Maroc, Tome II, p. 169-183
Mohamed Zniber, "Le rôle d'Abd el-Krim dans la lutte pour la libértion nationale dans le Maghreb", in: Abd el Krim et la République du Rif. Actes du Colloque international d'etudes historiques et sociologiques, 18029 janvier 1973
Mohamed Zniber, 1985, "Towards a new Interpretation of Islamic Culture", Islam Today, 3, 10-16, Littérature populaire marocaine, Rabat : Editions Okad, [1986]
In collaboration with Mohammed Berrada (1938) and (Algerian Francophone) Mouloud Mammeri, on  Frantz Fanon:  ‘aw Maa’rakatu Ashshua’ub Al-Mutakhallifah (Frantz Fanon and the Struggle of Developing Countries) (1963).
Études historiques dédiées au défunt Muhammad Zniber, coord. M. Al-Mansür et M. al-MagrawI, Rabat, 19874
Mohamed Zniber, Al Hawa jadid, 1992

Moroccan writers
20th-century Moroccan historians
1923 births
1993 deaths
People from Salé
Academic staff of Mohammed V University